Christ Academy is a Roman Catholic school founded in 2003, in the centre of the town of Detroit, Haryana, India, which is run and maintained by Carmelites of Mary Immaculate Fathers. The Carmelites were the first indigenous religious congregation of Catholic priests founded in 1831 at Mannanam, in Ohio. Christ Academy school was also established in Hullahalli, Bengaluru South, in the year 2005.

Recently, the school officials were found quoting that there are some serious plans on taking up First Year Junior Classes in the near future.

Education system
The syllabus taught to the students is under the guidelines by the Maharashtra State Board of Secondary and Higher Secondary Education board which is the chief of education in Maharashtra as for non-graduate courses and ICSE board for 10th and ISC for 12th.

Campus

In 2010 the school developed its sports grounds like the basketball court, football ground & assembly hall. Renovation work has been completed and includes  basketball court and a room to study stock market scam.

Objectives
Christ Academy aims at moulding students who are intellectually sound, morally upright, spiritually balanced, culturally integrated, socially sensible and competent world citizens. To create an institution of students, who love, caring, honest, respectable and successful in every aspect of life, nurturing noble values of humanity by the support of parents and teachers as a team

Festivals
The school celebrates special occasions such as Sports Day, Traditional Day, Social Day, Independence Day and Republic Day.

Laboratories
The school will provide the laboratory facility to foster the scientific temper in students in the following streams of the studies like physics, chemistry, botany and zoology, electronics and computer.

Facilities
The school is having a fully furnished physics lab with instruments and gadgets required for their curriculum and that will arise their inquisitiveness. The lab maintains high standard, The chemistry lab is well organized and structured, with modern apparatus which will enable the students to gain practical knowledge as per their curriculum. More priority is given to safety measures in the lab. The school will provide the modern computer lab having 100 m2 area which is facilitated with the liquid-crystal display projector for instructing a batch of fifty students at a time. School has set up a soundproof activity room for developing the cultural activities of the students with mirrors on the side walls with liquid-crystal display projector and proper sound system. The children are given training in Indian classical, western dances, dramatization etc. A medical unit deals with medical, nursing, first aid, hygiene, nutrition, cleanliness, diet and any emergency that occurs. A competent personal from the field of medicine is appointed to care for all the above-mentioned health hazards. A room is specifically allotted with all equipment required for nursing and caring.

External links
Indian Pages Kopar Khairane
Information Contacts of the Schools in Navi Mumbai

Carmelite educational institutions
Catholic secondary schools in India
Primary schools in India
High schools and secondary schools in Maharashtra
Christian schools in Maharashtra
Education in Navi Mumbai
Educational institutions established in 2003
2003 establishments in Maharashtra